The Federal University of Technology – Paraná (UTFPR) is a federal university with campuses in thirteen cities located in the state of Paraná. 

UTFPR is one of the most renowned Universities in Brazil. Their teaching pattern is inspired by the European polytechnic university model. It specializes in natural sciences and engineering.

Campi 
The campi are located in the following cities:                                    
 Apucarana
 Campo Mourão
 Cornélio Procópio
 Curitiba
 Dois Vizinhos
 Francisco Beltrão
 Guarapuava
 Londrina
 Medianeira
 Ponta Grossa
 Pato Branco
 Santa Helena
 Toledo.

History 
On September 23, 1909, the President of Brazil, Nilo Peçanha created the Escolas de Aprendizes e Artífices (Schools of Apprentices and Artificers), in the Paraná state this school started on January 16, 1910, named Escola de Aprendizes e Artífices do Paraná (School of Apprentices and Artificers of Paraná).

Two decades later, it started acting as a basic education school and was renamed Industrial Lyceum of Curitiba (Portuguese: Liceu Industrial de Curitiba) in 1937. Later it was instituted together with federal industrial schools, renamed Technical School of Curitiba (Portuguese: Escola Técnica de Curitiba) in 1942 and then to Federal Technical School of Paraná (Portuguese: Escola Técnica Federal do Paraná) in 1959.

In 1978 it became a Federal Center of Technological Education., renamed Federal Center of Technological Education of Paraná (shortened CEFET-PR).

On October 7, 2005, president Luiz Inácio Lula da Silva transformed it into the first Federal University of Technology in Brazil, renamed Federal University of Technology – Paraná (shortened UTFPR). It still acts as a technical high school, classified as the best of Paraná, according to the Brazilian education index ENEM. And today is the best federal university in the state according to the Ministry of Education (MEC).

Degrees 
UTFPR offers Licentiate, Bachelor, Bachelor of Engineering and technology degrees.

Curitiba 
Those are the degrees offered by the UTFPR campus in Curitiba.

Licentiate 
 Physics
 Languages and literatures (English)
 Chemistry

Bachelor 
 Design
 Architecture & Urban Planning
 Information systems
 Physical education
 Administration
 Organizational communication
 Chemistry

Engineering 
 Electrical engineering branch
 Electronic engineering
 Electrical engineering
 Control engineering
 Computer engineering
 Mechanical engineering branch
 Mechanical engineering
 Mechatronics engineering
 Civil engineering branch
 Civil engineering

Technology 
 Institutional communication
 Concrete technology
 Graphic design
 Electrical commercial management
 Manufacture management
 Industrial mechatronics
 Environmental management
 Radiology
 Telecommunications
 Internet systems

Londrina 
Those are the degrees offered by the UTFPR campus in Londrina.

Licentiate 
 Chemistry

Engineering 
 Materials engineering
 Environmental engineering
 Chemical engineering
 Mechanical engineering
 Production engineering

Technology 
 Food technology

Medianeira 
Those are the degrees offered by the UTFPR campus in Medianeira.

Bachelor 
 Computer science

Licentiate 
 Chemistry

Engineering 
 Electrical engineering
 Industrial engineering
 Food engineering
 Environmental engineering
 Mechanical engineering

Technology 
 Food technology
 Industrial maintenance
 Environmental management

Pato Branco 
Those are the degrees offered by the UTFPR campus in Pato Branco.

Licentiate 
 Mathematics
 Languages and literatures (English)

Bachelor 
 Administration
 Agronomy
 Accountancy
 Chemistry

Engineering 
 Computer engineering
 Civil engineering
 Mechanical engineering
 Electrical engineering

Technology 
 System development and analysis
 Industrial maintenance

Ponta Grossa 
Those are the degrees offered by the UTFPR campus in Ponta Grossa.

Bachelor 
 Computer science

Engineering 
 Mechanical engineering
 Industrial engineering
 Chemical engineering
 Electrical engineering
 Bioprocess engineering

Technology 
 Food technology
 Industrial automation
 System Analysis and Development
 Mechanical manufacture

Dois Vizinhos 
These are the degrees offered by the UTFPR campus in Dois Vizinhos

Bachelor 
 Agronomy
 Animal Science
 Software Engineering
 Bioprocess Engineering and Biotechnology

Licentiate 
 Biological Sciences
 Rural Education (no longer offered)

Engineering 
 Forestry

Technology 
 Horticulture (no longer offered)

Santa Helena 
Those are the degrees offered by the UTFPR campus in Santa Helena.

Licentiate 
 Biological Sciences

Bachelor 
 Computer science

Campo Mourão 
Those are the degrees offered by the UTFPR campus in Campo Mourão.

Licentiate 
 Chemistry

Bachelor 
 Computer science

Engineering 
 Electronic engineering
 Environmental engineering
 Chemical engineering
 Civil engineering
 Food engineering

Technology 
 Food technology

Francisco Beltrão 
Those are the degrees offered by the UTFPR campus in Francisco Beltrão.

Licentiate 
 Informatics

Bachelor 
 Agronomy (to start in 2022)

Engineering 
 Environmental engineering
 Chemical engineering
 Food engineering

Technology 
 Food technology (no longer offered)

References

External links 

  
 Homepage for Cornélio Procópio
 Homepage for Curitiba 
 Homepage for Dois Vizinhos 
 Homepage for Medianeira
 Homepage for Pato Branco 
 Homepage for Ponta Grossa 
 Homepage for Santa Helena
 Homepage for Francisco Beltrão
 Handbook for Foreign Students - UTFPR, campus Dois Vizinhos/PR

 
1909 establishments in Brazil
Educational institutions established in 1909
Federal universities of Brazil
Universities and colleges in Curitiba